The 2003–04 Carolina Hurricanes season was the franchise's 25th season in the National Hockey League and seventh as the Hurricanes. The Hurricanes missed the playoffs for the second consecutive year.

Offseason

Regular season
On December 15, 2003, head coach Paul Maurice was fired after an 8–12–8–2 start to the season and replaced by former New York Islanders head coach Peter Laviolette.

The Hurricanes season finale against the Florida Panthers on April 4, 2004, was the final tie in NHL history. The Hurricane player who scored the final game-tying goal to make it 6–6 was defenseman Brad Fast, who was playing in his first and what proved to be his only NHL game. Fast is one of only five NHL one-gamers to score a goal in their lone NHL appearance. Ties were eliminated after the 2004–05 NHL lockout when the shootout was adopted.

The Hurricanes finished 30th overall in the NHL in scoring for the second consecutive season, with just 172 goals for. They also struggled on the power-play, finishing 30th overall in power-play goals scored, with 41, and 30th overall in power-play percentage, at 10.68% (41 for 384).

Final standings

Schedule and results

|- align="center" bgcolor="#FFBBBB"
|1||L||October 9, 2003||1–3 || align="left"| @ Florida Panthers (2003–04) ||0–1–0–0 || 
|- align="center" bgcolor="#FFBBBB"
|2||L||October 11, 2003||1–2 || align="left"|  New Jersey Devils (2003–04) ||0–2–0–0 || 
|- align="center" 
|3||T||October 13, 2003||2–2 OT|| align="left"|  Florida Panthers (2003–04) ||0–2–1–0 || 
|- align="center" 
|4||T||October 18, 2003||2–2 OT|| align="left"| @ New York Rangers (2003–04) ||0–2–2–0 || 
|- align="center" 
|5||T||October 22, 2003||1–1 OT|| align="left"| @ Pittsburgh Penguins (2003–04) ||0–2–3–0 || 
|- align="center" bgcolor="#CCFFCC" 
|6||W||October 23, 2003||2–0 || align="left"| @ Boston Bruins (2003–04) ||1–2–3–0 || 
|- align="center" 
|7||T||October 25, 2003||4–4 OT|| align="left"| @ Philadelphia Flyers (2003–04) ||1–2–4–0 || 
|- align="center" bgcolor="#CCFFCC" 
|8||W||October 28, 2003||3–0 || align="left"|  San Jose Sharks (2003–04) ||2–2–4–0 || 
|- align="center" bgcolor="#FFBBBB"
|9||L||October 30, 2003||1–4 || align="left"| @ New York Rangers (2003–04) ||2–3–4–0 || 
|-

|- align="center" bgcolor="#FFBBBB"
|10||L||November 1, 2003||3–4 || align="left"| @ Tampa Bay Lightning (2003–04) ||2–4–4–0 || 
|- align="center" bgcolor="#FFBBBB"
|11||L||November 2, 2003||1–2 || align="left"|  Toronto Maple Leafs (2003–04) ||2–5–4–0 || 
|- align="center" bgcolor="#CCFFCC" 
|12||W||November 6, 2003||6–3 || align="left"|  New York Rangers (2003–04) ||3–5–4–0 || 
|- align="center" bgcolor="#CCFFCC" 
|13||W||November 8, 2003||3–2 OT|| align="left"|  Los Angeles Kings (2003–04) ||4–5–4–0 || 
|- align="center" 
|14||T||November 9, 2003||1–1 OT|| align="left"|  Tampa Bay Lightning (2003–04) ||4–5–5–0 || 
|- align="center" bgcolor="#FFBBBB"
|15||L||November 12, 2003||1–7 || align="left"| @ Washington Capitals (2003–04) ||4–6–5–0 || 
|- align="center" bgcolor="#CCFFCC" 
|16||W||November 13, 2003||5–1 || align="left"|  Atlanta Thrashers (2003–04) ||5–6–5–0 || 
|- align="center" bgcolor="#FFBBBB"
|17||L||November 15, 2003||1–2 || align="left"|  Washington Capitals (2003–04) ||5–7–5–0 || 
|- align="center" 
|18||T||November 18, 2003||2–2 OT|| align="left"|  Philadelphia Flyers (2003–04) ||5–7–6–0 || 
|- align="center" bgcolor="#FFBBBB"
|19||L||November 20, 2003||1–6 || align="left"| @ Ottawa Senators (2003–04) ||5–8–6–0 || 
|- align="center" bgcolor="#FFBBBB"
|20||L||November 21, 2003||0–5 || align="left"| @ Buffalo Sabres (2003–04) ||5–9–6–0 || 
|- align="center" 
|21||T||November 23, 2003||0–0 OT|| align="left"|  Tampa Bay Lightning (2003–04) ||5–9–7–0 || 
|- align="center" bgcolor="#CCFFCC" 
|22||W||November 26, 2003||2–0 || align="left"| @ New York Islanders (2003–04) ||6–9–7–0 || 
|- align="center" bgcolor="#FFBBBB"
|23||L||November 28, 2003||2–4 || align="left"| @ Philadelphia Flyers (2003–04) ||6–10–7–0 || 
|- align="center" bgcolor="#CCFFCC" 
|24||W||November 29, 2003||4–3 || align="left"|  Pittsburgh Penguins (2003–04) ||7–10–7–0 || 
|-

|- align="center" bgcolor="#FF6F6F"
|25||OTL||December 3, 2003||1–2 OT|| align="left"|  Nashville Predators (2003–04) ||7–10–7–1 || 
|- align="center" 
|26||T||December 5, 2003||1–1 OT|| align="left"|  Montreal Canadiens (2003–04) ||7–10–8–1 || 
|- align="center" bgcolor="#FFBBBB"
|27||L||December 6, 2003||1–3 || align="left"| @ Montreal Canadiens (2003–04) ||7–11–8–1 || 
|- align="center" bgcolor="#CCFFCC" 
|28||W||December 9, 2003||3–2 || align="left"| @ Edmonton Oilers (2003–04) ||8–11–8–1 || 
|- align="center" bgcolor="#FFBBBB"
|29||L||December 11, 2003||0–1 || align="left"| @ Calgary Flames (2003–04) ||8–12–8–1 || 
|- align="center" bgcolor="#FF6F6F"
|30||OTL||December 14, 2003||1–2 OT|| align="left"| @ Vancouver Canucks (2003–04) ||8–12–8–2 || 
|- align="center" bgcolor="#CCFFCC" 
|31||W||December 18, 2003||2–1 OT|| align="left"|  Pittsburgh Penguins (2003–04) ||9–12–8–2 || 
|- align="center" bgcolor="#CCFFCC" 
|32||W||December 20, 2003||2–1 || align="left"| @ Boston Bruins (2003–04) ||10–12–8–2 || 
|- align="center" bgcolor="#FFBBBB"
|33||L||December 22, 2003||1–3 || align="left"|  Dallas Stars (2003–04) ||10–13–8–2 || 
|- align="center" bgcolor="#FFBBBB"
|34||L||December 26, 2003||1–3 || align="left"| @ Buffalo Sabres (2003–04) ||10–14–8–2 || 
|- align="center" bgcolor="#CCFFCC" 
|35||W||December 27, 2003||2–1 OT|| align="left"|  Montreal Canadiens (2003–04) ||11–14–8–2 || 
|- align="center" bgcolor="#CCFFCC" 
|36||W||December 29, 2003||2–1 || align="left"|  Buffalo Sabres (2003–04) ||12–14–8–2 || 
|- align="center" bgcolor="#FFBBBB"
|37||L||December 31, 2003||1–3 || align="left"|  Mighty Ducks of Anaheim (2003–04) ||12–15–8–2 || 
|-

|- align="center" bgcolor="#FFBBBB"
|38||L||January 2, 2004||1–4 || align="left"|  Detroit Red Wings (2003–04) ||12–16–8–2 || 
|- align="center" bgcolor="#FFBBBB"
|39||L||January 4, 2004||0–3 || align="left"|  Phoenix Coyotes (2003–04) ||12–17–8–2 || 
|- align="center" bgcolor="#CCFFCC" 
|40||W||January 6, 2004||2–0 || align="left"|  St. Louis Blues (2003–04) ||13–17–8–2 || 
|- align="center" bgcolor="#CCFFCC" 
|41||W||January 8, 2004||3–2 || align="left"|  New York Rangers (2003–04) ||14–17–8–2 || 
|- align="center" bgcolor="#FFBBBB"
|42||L||January 9, 2004||1–4 || align="left"| @ Washington Capitals (2003–04) ||14–18–8–2 || 
|- align="center" 
|43||T||January 11, 2004||2–2 OT|| align="left"|  Ottawa Senators (2003–04) ||14–18–9–2 || 
|- align="center" bgcolor="#FFBBBB"
|44||L||January 15, 2004||4–5 || align="left"| @ Tampa Bay Lightning (2003–04) ||14–19–9–2 || 
|- align="center" bgcolor="#CCFFCC" 
|45||W||January 16, 2004||4–3 || align="left"| @ Atlanta Thrashers (2003–04) ||15–19–9–2 || 
|- align="center" bgcolor="#FFBBBB"
|46||L||January 18, 2004||2–5 || align="left"|  Atlanta Thrashers (2003–04) ||15–20–9–2 || 
|- align="center" bgcolor="#FFBBBB"
|47||L||January 20, 2004||1–3 || align="left"|  Ottawa Senators (2003–04) ||15–21–9–2 || 
|- align="center" bgcolor="#CCFFCC" 
|48||W||January 21, 2004||2–1 || align="left"| @ New Jersey Devils (2003–04) ||16–21–9–2 || 
|- align="center" bgcolor="#FFBBBB"
|49||L||January 23, 2004||2–3 || align="left"|  New York Islanders (2003–04) ||16–22–9–2 || 
|- align="center" bgcolor="#FFBBBB"
|50||L||January 25, 2004||2–4 || align="left"|  Buffalo Sabres (2003–04) ||16–23–9–2 || 
|- align="center" bgcolor="#CCFFCC" 
|51||W||January 27, 2004||2–0 || align="left"| @ Toronto Maple Leafs (2003–04) ||17–23–9–2 || 
|- align="center" bgcolor="#FFBBBB"
|52||L||January 29, 2004||3–5 || align="left"|  Washington Capitals (2003–04) ||17–24–9–2 || 
|- align="center" 
|53||T||January 31, 2004||4–4 OT|| align="left"| @ Detroit Red Wings (2003–04) ||17–24–10–2 || 
|-

|- align="center" bgcolor="#FFBBBB"
|54||L||February 3, 2004||1–3 || align="left"| @ Colorado Avalanche (2003–04) ||17–25–10–2 || 
|- align="center" bgcolor="#FFBBBB"
|55||L||February 4, 2004||2–3 || align="left"| @ Mighty Ducks of Anaheim (2003–04) ||17–26–10–2 || 
|- align="center" 
|56||T||February 12, 2004||3–3 OT|| align="left"|  Washington Capitals (2003–04) ||17–26–11–2 || 
|- align="center" bgcolor="#FFBBBB"
|57||L||February 14, 2004||1–4 || align="left"| @ New Jersey Devils (2003–04) ||17–27–11–2 || 
|- align="center" bgcolor="#CCFFCC" 
|58||W||February 16, 2004||3–1 || align="left"|  Florida Panthers (2003–04) ||18–27–11–2 || 
|- align="center" bgcolor="#FF6F6F"
|59||OTL||February 19, 2004||1–2 OT|| align="left"|  Toronto Maple Leafs (2003–04) ||18–27–11–3 || 
|- align="center" 
|60||T||February 21, 2004||3–3 OT|| align="left"|  Boston Bruins (2003–04) ||18–27–12–3 || 
|- align="center" bgcolor="#CCFFCC" 
|61||W||February 23, 2004||2–1 || align="left"| @ Toronto Maple Leafs (2003–04) ||19–27–12–3 || 
|- align="center" bgcolor="#CCFFCC" 
|62||W||February 25, 2004||2–1 || align="left"| @ Washington Capitals (2003–04) ||20–27–12–3 || 
|- align="center" bgcolor="#FF6F6F"
|63||OTL||February 28, 2004||0–1 OT|| align="left"| @ Montreal Canadiens (2003–04) ||20–27–12–4 || 
|- align="center" 
|64||T||February 29, 2004||3–3 OT|| align="left"| @ Minnesota Wild (2003–04) ||20–27–13–4 || 
|-

|- align="center" bgcolor="#FFBBBB"
|65||L||March 2, 2004||0–3 || align="left"|  Columbus Blue Jackets (2003–04) ||20–28–13–4 || 
|- align="center" bgcolor="#CCFFCC" 
|66||W||March 5, 2004||3–2 OT|| align="left"| @ Atlanta Thrashers (2003–04) ||21–28–13–4 || 
|- align="center" bgcolor="#FFBBBB"
|67||L||March 6, 2004||1–4 || align="left"|  New Jersey Devils (2003–04) ||21–29–13–4 || 
|- align="center" bgcolor="#CCFFCC" 
|68||W||March 8, 2004||4–1 || align="left"| @ Columbus Blue Jackets (2003–04) ||22–29–13–4 || 
|- align="center" bgcolor="#FFBBBB"
|69||L||March 10, 2004||2–4 || align="left"|  Tampa Bay Lightning (2003–04) ||22–30–13–4 || 
|- align="center" bgcolor="#CCFFCC" 
|70||W||March 12, 2004||4–2 || align="left"|  Atlanta Thrashers (2003–04) ||23–30–13–4 || 
|- align="center" bgcolor="#CCFFCC" 
|71||W||March 13, 2004||5–1 || align="left"| @ Tampa Bay Lightning (2003–04) ||24–30–13–4 || 
|- align="center" bgcolor="#FF6F6F"
|72||OTL||March 15, 2004||0–1 OT|| align="left"| @ Atlanta Thrashers (2003–04) ||24–30–13–5 || 
|- align="center" bgcolor="#CCFFCC" 
|73||W||March 17, 2004||3–2 || align="left"| @ Chicago Blackhawks (2003–04) ||25–30–13–5 || 
|- align="center" bgcolor="#FF6F6F"
|74||OTL||March 19, 2004||3–4 OT|| align="left"| @ Pittsburgh Penguins (2003–04) ||25–30–13–6 || 
|- align="center" bgcolor="#CCFFCC" 
|75||W||March 20, 2004||3–2 OT|| align="left"| @ Ottawa Senators (2003–04) ||26–30–13–6 || 
|- align="center" bgcolor="#FFBBBB"
|76||L||March 23, 2004||2–4 || align="left"|  Philadelphia Flyers (2003–04) ||26–31–13–6 || 
|- align="center" bgcolor="#CCFFCC" 
|77||W||March 25, 2004||3–2 || align="left"|  Florida Panthers (2003–04) ||27–31–13–6 || 
|- align="center" bgcolor="#CCFFCC" 
|78||W||March 27, 2004||3–2 || align="left"| @ New York Islanders (2003–04) ||28–31–13–6 || 
|- align="center" bgcolor="#FFBBBB"
|79||L||March 29, 2004||1–3 || align="left"| @ Florida Panthers (2003–04) ||28–32–13–6 || 
|- align="center" bgcolor="#FFBBBB"
|80||L||March 30, 2004||2–3 || align="left"|  Boston Bruins (2003–04) ||28–33–13–6 || 
|-

|- align="center" bgcolor="#FFBBBB"
|81||L||April 2, 2004||4–6 || align="left"|  New York Islanders (2003–04) ||28–34–13–6 || 
|- align="center" 
|82||T||April 4, 2004||6–6 OT|| align="left"| @ Florida Panthers (2003–04) ||28–34–14–6 || 
|-

|-
| Legend:

Player statistics

Scoring
 Position abbreviations: C = Center; D = Defense; G = Goaltender; LW = Left Wing; RW = Right Wing
  = Joined team via a transaction (e.g., trade, waivers, signing) during the season. Stats reflect time with the Hurricanes only.
  = Left team via a transaction (e.g., trade, waivers, release) during the season. Stats reflect time with the Hurricanes only.

Goaltending

Awards and records

Awards

Transactions
The Hurricanes were involved in the following transactions from June 10, 2003, the day after the deciding game of the 2003 Stanley Cup Finals, through June 7, 2004, the day of the deciding game of the 2004 Stanley Cup Finals.

Trades

Players acquired

Players lost

Signings

Draft picks
Carolina's draft picks at the 2003 NHL Entry Draft held at the Gaylord Entertainment Center in Nashville, Tennessee.

Farm teams

American Hockey League
The Lowell Lock Monsters are the Hurricanes American Hockey League affiliate for the 2003–04 AHL season.

ECHL
The Florida Everblades are the Hurricanes ECHL affiliate.

Notes

References

 
 

Carol
Carol
Carolina Hurricanes seasons
Hurr
Hurr